Gevorg Avetisi Khachatrian (PhD)  (1936–1996)  Armenian scientist, teacher, and engineer. Member of the EAS of RA, doctor of technical sciences, professor. He is an Honorary Member of the Freiberg University of Mining and Technology and an Emeritus Professor of Mining Profile Universities in several countries.

Biography 
Khachatrian was born in 1936 in Yerevan. In the history of the Soviet and post-Soviet Armenia, he is one of only two PhD in Mining Engineering, together with Y. Agabalyan. For 20 years, from 1976 to 1996, he was the Dean of the Department of Mining Engineering and Metallurgy of Yerevan State Polytechnic Institute.

He is the author of more than 500 scientific articles, monographs, manuals, textbooks, and dozens of discoveries.

Khachatrian died in 1996 at age 60.

References

1936 births
1996 deaths
Engineers from Yerevan
20th-century engineers